Ochropleura costalis is a moth of the family Noctuidae. It is found in the north-eastern parts of the  Himalaya and on Borneo.

The larvae feed on Caryophyllaceae, Chenopodiaceae, Plantaginaceae, Asteraceae, Polygonaceae and Rubiaceae species.

External links
Moths of Borneo

Ochropleura